

Egyptian Premier League

CAF Champions league

Group stage

Semifinals

Final

FIFA Club World Cup

All times Japan Standard Time (UTC+09:00).

Quarter-finals

Semi-finals

Match for third place

Al Ahly SC seasons
Al-Ahly